Padma Choling (alternatively Pema Thinley, Pelma Chiley, Baima Chilin; ; born October 1952) is a Chinese politician of Tibetan ethnicity. He was the eighth chairman of the Tibet Autonomous Region (TAR), but in January 2013, was replaced by his deputy Losang Jamcan. Later he served as the Tibet Autonomous Region People's Congress. As Chairman of TAR, Choling was the "most senior ethnic Tibetan in the regional government", though he was subordinate to the TAR Communist Party Chief Zhang Qingli, and later his successor Chen Quanguo.

Biography 
Padma Choling was born in 1952 in a farming family in Dêngqên County, Chamdo Prefecture. He joined the People's Liberation Army in Qinghai Province at 17, and served in the army for seventeen years. In the army he played basketball and mastered the Chinese language. He joined the Chinese Communist Party in October 1970. He was an official in the Tibetan regional government since December 1969, working in Xigaze and then Lhasa, rising to the vice-chairmanship of the TAR in 2003. After his anodyne handling of an earthquake in Damxung County outside Lhasa, he was elected the chairman of the Tibet Autonomous Region in 2010.

On 7 December 2020, pursuant to Executive Order 13936 signed by President Donald J. Trump Choling, being a vice chairperson of the NPC was sanctioned by the US Department of the Treasury. Every other Vice Chairperson of the National People's Congress were sanctioned as well, for "undermining Hong Kong's autonomy and restricting the freedom of expression or assembly."

Chairmanship 
Personally, he has been described as "stern, but... amiable" in contrast to his "soft-spoken" predecessor Qiangba Puncog. In addition to stability and ethnic harmony, he has set a goal of 12 percent GDP growth and a ¥4,000 per capita GDP for farmers and herders in the Tibet Autonomous Region. To bring this about, he has signed an agreement with the Ministry of Commerce of the Central Government to allow it to promote trade with South Asia, including Nepal. Padma is of the opinion that there is no "issue of Tibet" that the Dalai Lama says, and questions the Lama's ability to judge the situation in Tibet since he has not been in Tibet since 1959.

On the issue of religion, Padma has said that he and the Karmapa, Ogyen Trinley Dorje are "mates from the same hometown". At the 2010 National People's Congress, he announced that the choosing of the 15th Dalai Lama would abide by the "requirements of Tibetan Buddhist tradition", including approval by the government, instead of being the choice of the 14th Dalai Lama. Already, he has dismissed the Dalai Lama's choice for the 11th Panchen Lama as "invalid"..

Moreover, Pema Thinley, said at a Press Conference that Gedun Choki Nyima - the child recognized by the Dalai Lama as the reincarnation of the 10th Panchen Lama - is an ordinary person, and that he and his parents wanted to stay away from public attention for their own safety.

On 17 March 2018, Padma was elected as the Vice Chairperson of the Standing Committee of the National People's Congress.

Padma is a member of the 18th Central Committee of the Chinese Communist Party.

References 

1952 births
Living people
Chairperson and vice chairpersons of the Standing Committee of the 13th National People's Congress
Chinese Communist Party politicians from Tibet
Delegates to the 11th National People's Congress
Delegates to the 12th National People's Congress
Individuals sanctioned by the United States under the Hong Kong Autonomy Act
Members of the 18th Central Committee of the Chinese Communist Party
People from Chamdo
People's Republic of China politicians from Tibet
Political office-holders in Tibet
Specially Designated Nationals and Blocked Persons List
Tibetan politicians
Vice Chairpersons of the National People's Congress